Zhaoqing University is a public university based in the Duanzhou District of the prefecture-level city of Zhaoqing, Guangdong Province, China. It is a provincial comprehensive university that enrolls students in four-year degree programmes.

History 

Zhaoqing University was established in 1970. It assists in the social and economic development in Zhaoqing and the adjacent Yunfu district, both of which have a population of over seven million.

Campuses
The university’s two campuses occupy an area of 67.73 hectares and have 349,215 square meters of floor space.

Main Campus
The Main Campus is in Donggang. It is the older of the two campuses and consists of the major teaching departments, laboratories and research facilities and includes the teacher training, career education and international programmes.

Star Lake Campus
The Star Lake Campus is adjacent to Star Lake. The campus buildings surround a small artificial lake that is visible when entering through the front gate. In 2000 the only thing that could be seen from the campus were rice paddies and fish farming ponds. In the past years the surrounding area has seen much development and large multistory apartment buildings can now be seen from the complex. The campus is the centre for the adult education programme and other studies.

The Star Lake Campus was formerly an independent university named Zhaoqing Institute of Education. It was a teaching college whose students were primarily from Guangdong Province and included a small minority from neighboring provinces. In March 2000 it merged with Xijiang University to form the current Zhaoqing University.

The Star Lake Campus has had a sister college relationship with Anoka-Ramsey Community College in the U.S. state of Minnesota since 1994. Upon the merger of the two Chinese universities, this sister relationship has continued on with Zhaoqing University. Every year a Chinese language and culture teacher spends a full academic year at Anoka-Ramsey Community College and several American students study at Zhaoqing University.

Administration 
The university has 1,049 members of staff, 675 of them are faculty members. There are 10,947 full-time and 5,347 part-time students.

Faculties and departments
The university is organized in the following faculties.
Faulty of Teacher Education
Faculty of Foreign Languages
Faculty of Politics and Law
Faculty of Economics and Management
Faculty of Pedagogy
Faculty of Mathematics and Information Sciences
Faculty of Computer Science and Software
Faculty of Chemistry and Chemical Engineering
Faculty of Life Sciences
Faculty of Electronic Information Mechanical and Electrical Engineering
Faculty of Physical Education and Health
Faculty of Fine Arts
Faculty of Music
Faculty of Tourism
Faculty of Chinese Language and Literature
Faculty of Continuing Education

References

External links 
Zhaoqing University

Buildings and structures in Zhaoqing
Universities and colleges in Guangdong
Educational institutions established in 1970